Mark E. Farrell (born 1974) is an American politician and lawyer who served as the 44th Mayor of San Francisco from January 23 to July 11, 2018. Before his appointment as mayor, he served on the Board of Supervisors for nearly two terms, representing District 2 (the Marina, Cow Hollow, Pacific Heights, Seacliff, Lake District, Presidio Heights, Jordan Park, Laurel Heights, Presidio, and part of Russian Hill).

Early life and education 
Farrell was born in 1974, the only child of Lena (née Ewoldt), a former flight attendant from Probstei, Germany near Kiel and John Farrell, a former Air Force pilot, and attorney, who grew up near the Palace of Fine Arts on Broderick Street. Farrell spent his summers at his cousin's family farm in Probstei.

Farrell attended both Stuart Hall for Boys and Saint Ignatius College Preparatory, and subsequently received a B.A. in 1996 from Loyola Marymount University in Los Angeles, an M.A. from University College Dublin in Ireland, and a J.D. in 2001 from the University of Pennsylvania Law School in Philadelphia.

Career
Prior to being elected to San Francisco's Board of Supervisors, Farrell practiced law as a corporate and securities attorney at Wilson Sonsini Goodrich & Rosati in Silicon Valley, then joined Thomas Weisel Partners as an investment banker. He subsequently co-founded Quest Hospitality Ventures, a San Francisco-based venture capital firm focused on the hospitality and travel sector. Prior to his election to the Board of Supervisors, he served as a mid-level director of Quest Hospitality Ventures, now Thayer Ventures a venture capital firm.

San Francisco Board of Supervisors 
Farrell was first elected in November 2010 by the voters of District 2, and subsequently reelected in November 2014 for his second term. Farrell served as Chair of the Budget and Finance Committee, a founding member of the 2016–17 Super Bowl Bid Committee, and on eight other local and state boards and committees.

After his election to the Board of Supervisors, Farrell ushered through a two-year city budget that reformed the way San Francisco paid for retiree health care benefits and passed small business tax credit legislation so the city's small businesses could hire more employees and create more local jobs. In addition, Farrell created a public-private partnership between the San Francisco non-profit Kiva.org and San Francisco's Office of Small Business. He also became the first elected official in California to endorse Kiva borrowers on the platform personally.

Farrell introduced an ordinance in 2015 that required gun store owners to video record all transactions and give weekly updates on ammunition sales to the police department. High Bridge Arms, the only firearm retailer in the city, closed after the ordinance was passed. Farrell told the San Francisco Chronicle, "From my perspective, if the last gun store in San Francisco wants to close its doors because of my legislation, so be it."

To address homelessness in San Francisco, Farrell led the effort to double San Francisco's Homeless Outreach Team, authored and passed Laura's Law, a state law that allows for community-based compelled mental health treatment for the severely mentally ill, and has hosted hearings on services and solutions to reduce homelessness in San Francisco.

Farrell created the Schoolyards Project, which opens public schoolyards on the weekends and annually sponsors the Marina Family Festival in District 2. 

Farrell led a coalition to create "Free Wi-Fi" in city parks, plazas, and open spaces. Farrell also authored and passed the city's landmark open data legislation that continued San Francisco's national leadership in the open data movement and will promote further local economic development and government efficiency.

San Francisco Ethics Commission 2014 decision
In June 2016, Farrell was ordered to repay $191,000 in unlawful campaign funding after the City ethics panel voted, 5-0, to uphold the original 2014 decision of the San Francisco Ethics Commission that he should have to forfeit back to the City the amount raised from just two donors and used late in the 2010 election by Common Sense Voters, an independent expenditure committee, with improper communications from a campaign consultant. Farrell was exonerated by the California Fair Political Practices Commission, although the campaign consultant Chris Lee and Common Sense Voters were found to be in violation of federal campaign finance laws, but a further complaint was filed with the City commission by Janet Reilly, who lost to Farrell by 256 votes. City law, stricter than state law, holds candidates personally responsible for staff as well as themselves, whether they knew about the illegal communication or not. In an unusual move, Farrell responded with a lawsuit against the City in May to prevent further collection efforts from the Treasurer's office, and settled with the City for $25,000 in Oct. 2016.

Mayor of San Francisco 
Farrell was appointed as mayor by the Board of Supervisors on January 23, 2018, succeeding acting mayor London Breed. In her capacity as President of the Board of Supervisors, Breed had been serving as acting mayor since the death of Mayor Ed Lee on December 12, 2017. Farrell's appointment expired on July 11, 2018, following a citywide special election held on June 5, 2018. Farrell did not seek election. Breed won that election and served out the remainder of Lee's uncompleted term into January 8, 2020. She was elected on November 5, 2019 to a full term as mayor beginning January 8, 2020.

Personal life
Farrell's wife, Liz, was raised in Danville. She was formerly a morning TV news producer. The couple has two children.

References

External links

 Supervisor Mark Farrell via archive.org/web
 Form 700 Disclosures City and County of San Francisco
 Campaign website

|-

Living people
Mayors of San Francisco
Lawyers from San Francisco
California Democrats
Loyola Marymount University alumni
Alumni of University College Dublin
University of Pennsylvania Law School alumni
San Francisco Board of Supervisors members
21st-century American politicians
1974 births